Aston Martin Residences is a skyscraper under construction in Miami, located in downtown along the Miami River and Biscayne Bay. It is expected to be the tallest all-residential building south of New York City, though it is slightly shorter than the Panorama Tower in nearby Brickell. The building will feature a full-service marina that can accommodate superyachts.
The building will have nearly 400 residences, the majority of which have been sold as of 2020. The main penthouse unit includes an Aston Martin Vulcan with purchase. The building topped out in December 2021.

History
The  site was purchased at a record price of US$100 million per acre, selling for US$125 million in 2014. In 2019 concrete for construction was poured over 36 hours, and was expected to be the largest single pour to date in the Miami region. Over 30 floors have been built as of late 2020. On December 1, 2021, the building officially topped out as the tallest residential building south of New York City with a fireworks display on the Miami River, commemorating this milestone for the building as the second tallest building in Miami and Florida.

See also
List of tallest buildings in Miami

References

Residential condominiums in Miami
Residential skyscrapers in Miami